San Antonio de Esmoruco is the third municipal section of the Sur Lípez Province in the Potosí Department in Bolivia. Its seat is San Antonio de Esmoruco.

Subdivision 
The municipality consists of the following cantons: 
 Guadalupe Canton - 497 inhabitants (2001)
 San Antonio de Esmoruco Canton - 1,169 inhabitants

The people 
The people are predominantly indigenous citizens of Quechua descent.

See also 
 Guadalupe, Sud Lípez
 Muruq'u
 Nina Urqu
 Waqrayuq

References

External links 
San Antonio de Esmoruco Municipality: population data and map

Municipalities of Potosí Department